The Cleaning Lady is an American crime drama television series developed by Miranda Kwok, based on the 2017 Argentinian television series La chica que limpia. The series premiered on Fox on January 3, 2022. In April 2022, the series was renewed for a second season, which premiered on September 19, 2022. In February 2023, the series was renewed for a third season.

Premise
The Cleaning Lady is a drama that centers on Thony De La Rosa, formerly a Cambodian-Filipino surgeon who is currently working and living in Las Vegas. Her reason for being in the US on an expired visa is her five-year-old son, Luca. Luca has a rare and life-threatening medical disorder for which he needs a cutting-edge bone marrow treatment, which is only available in Las Vegas. Until she gets treatment for her son, Thony makes a living not as a trained physician but as a cleaning service worker, alongside her sister-in-law, Fiona. After Thony accidentally witnesses a serious crime and is discovered hiding by the perpetrator, Arman Morales, she is offered a job both as a cleaner and a doctor within their criminal organization that could pay well enough to help her son and her family. Crossing into a moral gray zone, Thony begins living a double life, keeping secrets from her family, all the while cleaning up murder scenes and dodging the law.

Cast and characters

Main

 Élodie Yung as Thony De La Rosa, formerly a surgeon in one of Manila's best hospitals, now trapped in Las Vegas as an undocumented immigrant due to her visa expiring. She becomes a cleaner for the mob in order to gain the connections needed to procure treatment for her sick son.
 Adan Canto as Arman Morales, a gangster associated with a powerful Armenian crime family operating in Las Vegas. He agrees to protect Thony and help her son in exchange for her services as a cleaner.
 Oliver Hudson as Garrett Miller, an FBI agent who goes after Thony in his effort to bring down Arman
 Martha Millan as Fiona De La Rosa, Thony's sister-in-law and closest friend, with whom she and her son live.
 Sebastien and Valentino LaSalle as Luca De La Rosa, Thony's son. He suffers from a rare autoimmune illness that forces Thony to keep him hidden from the outside world to protect him from contagion.
 Sean Lew as Chris, Fiona's son
 Faith Bryant as Jaz, Fiona's daughter
 Eva De Dominici as Nadia Morales (season 2; recurring season 1), Arman's wife
 Naveen Andrews as Robert Kamdar (season 2)

Recurring

 Navid Negahban as Hayak Barsamian
 Ivan Shaw as Marco De La Rosa, Thony's abusive husband and Fiona's brother
 Jay Mohr as Councilman Eric Knight
 Liza Weil as Katherine Russo
 Shiva Negar as Isabel Barsamian
 Chelsea Frei as Maya Campbell (season 2)
 K.C. Collins as Tyler Jefferson (season 2)
 Ryan Sands as JD Harris (season 2), Jaz's father

Special guest star
 Lou Diamond Phillips as Joe Fabroa

Episodes

Series overview

Season 1 (2022)

Season 2 (2022)

Production

Development
On October 22, 2019, it was announced that Warner Bros. Television Studios had acquired the remake rights to the Spanish-language Argentinian television series La Chica Que Limpia and was developing an English-language adaptation for Fox, with a script commitment attached. Miranda Kwok was set to write and develop the series adaptation, with Kwok also attached to executive produce with Melissa Carter and Shay Mitchell. On January 23, 2020, Fox gave the project a pilot order, the first for the network's 2020–21 television season, with Fox Entertainment and Warner Bros. Television Studios set as co-production partners. The series was ultimately pushed back to the 2021–22 television season due to the COVID-19 pandemic, with Fox giving a series greenlight consisting of ten hour-long episodes on May 7, 2021. Carter was set as showrunner and executive producer along with Kwok, and Michael Offer was also announced as director and executive producer of the pilot. On May 17, 2021, during Fox's Upfront presentation, it was confirmed the series would premiere as a midseason entry during the 2021–22 television season. On April 7, 2022, Fox renewed the series for a second season. On August 25, 2022, it was reported that Kwok was promoted to showrunner, alongside Carter, for the second season. On February 1, 2023, Fox renewed the series for a third season, and Jeannine Renshaw joined as an executive producer and co-showrunner.

Casting
In March 2020, Shannyn Sossamon, Adan Canto, Ginger Gonzaga, and Vincent Piazza were cast in main roles for the pilot. However, Sossamon exited the project after the pilot's initial table read. On April 6, 2020, Élodie Yung was cast to replace Sossamon in the lead role. It was announced that the ethnicity of Yung's character would be changed to match Yung's Cambodian background, but that aspects of Filipino culture would still be integrated. On July 2, 2020, Fox extended the cast options for the pilot through September 30, with the previous option having expired on June 30. Due to the pandemic, cast options were extended further on October 2, 2020. Upon the series order announcement, it was publicized that Martha Millan had replaced Gonzaga in the series and that Piazza had dropped out. In addition, twins Sebastien and Valentino LaSalle were also cast in a shared starring role. On July 13, 2021, Oliver Hudson was cast to replace Piazza. On September 21, 2021, Shiva Negar and Jay Mohr joined the cast in recurring roles. On December 14, 2021, Liza Weil and Eva De Dominici were cast in recurring capacities. In August 2022, De Dominici was promoted to a series regular, while Chelsea Frei was cast in a recurring role and Naveen Andrews joined as a series regular for the second season. On September 27, 2022, K.C. Collins joined the cast in a recurring role for the second season.

Filming
The pilot originally started filming on March 10, 2020, in New Mexico, but production was suspended three days later due to the COVID-19 pandemic. By July 2020, Fox had committed to filming the pilot alongside the network's five other pilots ordered for the 2020–21 television season, with production set to resume that summer. However, filming was delayed again to October 5, 2020, and again to February 2021.

Broadcast
The first season of The Cleaning Lady premiered on January 3, 2022, and concluded on March 14, 2022, on Fox. The second season debuted on September 19, 2022, and finished on December 12, 2022.

Reception

Critical response
The review aggregator website Rotten Tomatoes reported a 60% approval rating based on 15 critic reviews, with an average rating of 6.8/10, . The website's critics consensus reads, "Elodie Yung is winning as a resourceful protagonist in over her head, but The Cleaning Lady needs to polish its clichés into something more substantial if it wants to truly sparkle." Metacritic, which uses a weighted average, assigned a score of 53 out of 100 based on 9 critics, indicating "mixed or average reviews".

Ratings

Season 1

Season 2

Notes

References

External links
 The Cleaning Lady on Fox
 

2020s American crime drama television series
2020s American medical television series
2022 American television series debuts
American television series based on Argentine television series
Asian-American television
English-language television shows
Fox Broadcasting Company original programming
Television series about immigration
Television series about organized crime
Television series about the Federal Bureau of Investigation
Television series by Fox Entertainment
Television series by Warner Bros. Television Studios
Television shows filmed in New Mexico
Television shows set in Las Vegas
 Television shows set in Nevada
Television productions postponed due to the COVID-19 pandemic
Television productions suspended due to the COVID-19 pandemic
Works about illegal immigration to the United States